The following is a list of Major League Baseball players, retired or active. As of the end of the 2011 season, there have been 580 players with a last name that begins with T who have been on a major league roster at some point.

T

For reasons of space, this list has been split into two pages:
 Jeff Tabaka through Sloppy Thurston
 Luis Tiant through Ty Tyson

External links
Last Names starting with T - Baseball-Reference.com

 T